Oberweilersbach Castle is a levelled mediaeval lowland castle in the northwest of the parish of Oberweilersbach, in the municipality of Weilersbach in the county of  Forchheim in the south German state of Bavaria.

Nothing of the castle, which was mentioned in the records in the 12th century, has survived.

Literature 
 Hellmut Kunstmann: Die Burgen der südwestlichen Fränkischen Schweiz. Aus der Reihe: Veröffentlichungen der Gesellschaft für Fränkische Geschichte Reihe IX: Darstellungen aus der Fränkischen Geschichte, Vol. 28. Kommissionsverlag Degener und Co., Neustadt/Aisch, 1990, pp. 136–153.

External links 
 

Castles in Bavaria
Forchheim (district)